Korsvegen is a village in the municipality of Melhus in Trøndelag county, Norway. The village was the administrative centre of the old municipality of Hølonda which existed from 1865 until 1964. 
 

References

Melhus
Villages in Trøndelag